Red China may refer to:

 Communist-controlled China (1927–49), territories held during the Chinese Civil War
 Maoist China, the People's Republic of China under Mao Zedong (1949–1976)
 People's Republic of China
 China during the Cultural Revolution
Red China Blues: My Long March from Mao to Now, a book by journalist Jan Wong